The John Mayer 2008 Summer Tour is a concert tour by musician John Mayer to support his third album, Continuum.

Support acts
The support acts for the tour are:
Colbie Caillat and Brett Dennen - US (First leg for most 2008 Summer Tour dates)
OneRepublic and Paramore - US (Second leg of 2008 Summer Tour)

Setlist 
Waiting on the World to Change
Belief
Daughters '74'
Bigger Than My Body
Slow Dancing in a Burning Room
Clarity
Crossroads
I Don't Need No Doctor
Stop This Train
No Such Thing/Why Georgia
Stitched Up
Say
Encore
3x5
Vultures
Gravity

Tour dates

References

External links 
 Official Tour web site

2008 concert tours
John Mayer concert tours